Game for Three Losers is a 1965 British drama film directed by Gerry O'Hara and starring Michael Gough, Mark Eden and Toby Robins. It was made at Merton Park Studios as part of the long-running series of Edgar Wallace adaptations; this being adapted from a novel of the same name by Edgar Lustgarten.

Plot
Happily married businessman and politician Robert Hilary lets his desire for his new secretary get the better of him, and he kisses her.
Her boyfriend finds out and blackmails him, but when the blackmailer continues to return for more money Robert decides to call in the authorities. However, this leads to severe consequences for all.

Cast
Michael Gough as Robert Hilary
Mark Eden as Oliver Marchant
Toby Robins as Frances Challinor
Rachel Gurney as Adele
Allan Cuthbertson as Garsden
Al Mulock as Nick
Roger Hammond as Peter Fletcher
Lockwood West as Justice Tree
Mark Dignam as Attorney General
Catherine Willmer as Miss Stewart
Anne Pichon as Miss Fawcett
Kenneth Benda as Bryce
Leslie Sarony as Harley
David Lander as Burton
David Browning as Casey
Frank Forsyth as Jimmy
Toni Palmer as Jackie
Donald Tandy as Conyers
Colin Douglas as Superintendent Manton
Peter Bennett as Watkins

References

External links
Film page at BFI

1965 films
British drama films
1965 drama films
Edgar Wallace Mysteries
British black-and-white films
1960s English-language films
1960s British films